Christian Alfred Thun (born 24 February 1992) is a German professional boxer who has held the IBO Continental heavyweight title since 2020.

Personal life
Christian Alfred Thun was born on 24 February 1992 in Ennepetal, Germany, to a German father and Italian mother. He moved to Italy when he was 5 and then to England around 12 years old, where he began his amateur boxing career. He was introduced to boxing at the Peacock Gym in London and had his first fight at 15. After spending most of his career in England, Thun had the opportunity to box in Italy in 2013, where he secured a place on the Italian Olympic team. 

Alongside boxing, in which he compiled an amateur record of 49–6, Thun also obtained a Bachelor's degree in International Business Management in London. He speaks five languages; English, Italian, German, Spanish, and Russian.

Professional career
Thun made his professional debut on 2 March 2018, scoring a second-round technical knockout (TKO) victory against Georgi Urjumelashvili at the Espace Leó Ferré in Fontvieille, Monaco.

He scored two victories in 2018–a knockout (KO) against Davit Gogishvili in June and a points decision (PTS) against Euloge Bakanda Boule in September–before facing Viktar Chvarkou on 16 March 2019, at the Hotel W in Barcelona, Spain. Thun emerged victorious after Chvrakou was disqualified in the sixth round for two intentional headbutts.

After a stoppage victory against Jason Bergman in August 2020, Thun fought for his first regional championship against Mirko Tintor on 14 November at the Universum Gym in Hamburg, Germany. In a fight which saw Thun knock his opponent down in the first and second rounds, he went on to capture the vacant IBO Continental heavyweight title via third-round corner retirement (RTD) after Tintor quit on his stool before the start of the fourth round.

The first defence of his IBO regional title is scheduled to take place on 13 August 2021, at Atlantis The Palm in Dubai, against former world champion Lucas Browne.

Professional boxing record

References

External links

Living people
1994 births
People from Ennepe-Ruhr-Kreis
Sportspeople from Arnsberg (region)
German people of Italian descent
German male boxers
Italian male boxers
Heavyweight boxers